Cape Crawford is a location in the Northern Territory.

Cape Crawford, 100 kilometres south-west of Borroloola in the Northern Territory in Australia, is surrounded by savannah woodland, rock escarpments, waterfalls and waterholes. From here it is possible to organise a helicopter ride over the 'lost city' (large sandstone outcrops and formations formed 1.4 billion years ago) of the Limmen National Park. There is also an airport nearby called Cape Crawford Airport.

See also
Katherine, Northern Territory
Borroloola
Protected areas of the Northern Territory

External links
 Cape crawford Region Tourism Site
Cape Crawford Tourism

Tourist attractions in the Northern Territory
Landforms of the Northern Territory
Headlands of Australia